The 1955 New Hampshire Wildcats football team was an American football team that represented the University of New Hampshire as a member of the Yankee Conference during the 1955 college football season. In its seventh year under head coach Chief Boston, the team compiled a 2–4–2 record (1–1–2 against conference opponents) and finished fourth out of six teams in the Yankee Conference.

Schedule

References

New Hampshire
New Hampshire Wildcats football seasons
New Hampshire Wildcats football